Ateshun may refer to:
 Ateshun, Bardsir, Kerman Province
 Ateshun-e Namju, Kerman Province
 Ateshun-e Olya, Kerman Province
 Ateshun, Tehran

See also
 Atashan (disambiguation)